Placerovci is a settlement on the left bank of the Drava River in the Municipality of Gorišnica in northeastern Slovenia. The area traditionally belonged to the Styria region. It is now included in the Drava Statistical Region.

Notable people 
Notable people that were born or lived in Placerovi include the following:
Slavko Vesenjak (born 1981), lawyer

References

External links
Placerovci on Geopedia

Populated places in the Municipality of Gorišnica